The 1993 San Marino Grand Prix was a Formula One motor race held at Imola on 25 April 1993. It was the fourth race of the 1993 Formula One World Championship.

The 61-lap race was won by Alain Prost, driving a Williams-Renault, after he started from pole position. Prost's teammate Damon Hill led the early stages of the race before suffering a brake failure. Michael Schumacher finished second in a Benetton-Ford, with Martin Brundle third in a Ligier-Renault.

Report

Qualifying
The Williamses were 1–2 in qualifying with Prost on pole ahead of Hill, Schumacher, Senna, Wendlinger and Andretti. Both McLaren drivers collided with the barrier after experiencing active suspension problems.

Only 0.176 seconds separated 5th to 11th place on the grid.

Race
At the start, Prost was passed by Hill and Senna (who had already got ahead of Schumacher). Hill led Senna, Prost, Schumacher, Wendlinger and Andretti at the end of lap 1.

Hill pulled away quickly while Senna held up Prost. Prost passed Senna on lap 8 and set off after Hill. It was time for the stops and Senna got ahead of Prost in these stops. On lap 17, Prost audaciously overtook both Hill and Senna at Tosa in the presence of backmarkers. At the same time, Senna got ahead of Hill. Hill didn't last long, retiring with brake failure on lap 21. Both McLarens soon went out, Andretti from fifth on lap 33 by spinning off and Senna from second on lap 43 with a hydraulic failure. In between, Alesi, who took fifth after Andretti's spin retired with clutch failure. After being held up by Suzuki's Footwork, a large battle took place between Lehto and the two Lotuses of Herbert and Zanardi. Zanardi locked his front brakes into the final chicane, overshooting and ripping an oil line. Rejoining the circuit with the rear of the car on fire, he shortly retired on the approach to Tamburello. 

Schumacher was now second and Wendlinger was third but Wendlinger retired with engine failure on lap 49, giving third to Brundle. Prost won from Schumacher, Brundle, Lehto, Philippe Alliot and Barbazza.

Classification

Qualifying

Race

Championship standings after the race

Drivers' Championship standings

Constructors' Championship standings

 Note: Only the top five positions are included for both sets of standings.

References

San Marino Grand Prix
San Marino Grand Prix
San Marino Grand Prix
San Marino Grand Prix